This list of freshwater fish recorded in Japan is primarily based on the IUCN Red List, which, for fish found in inland waters, details the conservation status of some two hundred and sixty-one species, seventy-three of them endemic. Of these, one is assessed as extinct in the wild (the endemic Black kokanee), seven as critically endangered (the Sakhalin sturgeon, Chinese sturgeon, Sakhalin taimen, and endemic Tango stripe spined loach, Kissing loach, Cave goby, and Urauchi-isohaze), twenty as endangered, twelve as vulnerable, ten as near threatened, one hundred and seventy-nine as of least concern, and thirty-two as data deficient. This total includes species such as the Immaculate puffer, which, according to the IUCN Red List, may be characterized as a "marine species which occurs in estuaries...but is not dependent on these systems".

According to statistics accompanying the 2020 Japanese Ministry of the Environment (MoE) Red List, and the 2014 Red Data Book, approximately four hundred species and subspecies of freshwater fish and brackish water fish are to be found, but the conservation status of only two hundred and forty-five is detailed. Of these, three taxa are extinct from a domestic perspective (the Green sturgeon, Short ninespine stickleback, and endemic Suwa gudgeon), one extinct in the wild (the endemic Black kokanee), seventy-one critically endangered, fifty-four endangered, forty-four vulnerable, thirty-five near threatened, and thirty-seven data deficient. As of January 2021, for their protection, ten species and subspecies have been designated National Endangered Species by Cabinet Order in accordance with the 1992 Act on Conservation of Endangered Species of Wild Fauna and Flora.

As for the inland water fishes of the Ryūkyūs, a 2014 checklist detailed some 678 species, in 110 families, and 27 orders, but of these, 334 are primarily marine species "but accidentally migrate to inland waters", with a further 229 estuarine species (143 residential, 86 peripheral), 59 species being fluvial, and 56 diadromous. In addition, it is noted that most of the fluvial species on Okinawa Island are alien. A 1998 study, drawing on earlier editions of the above works by Nakabo and Kawanabe, lists 211 taxa nationwide, in 35 families, and 15 orders, comprising 134 fluvial and lacustrine fishes (63%) and 77 diadromous fishes (37%), including 88 endemics (41%) and 23 exotics (11%).

As of the 7 July 2021 update, Eschmeyer's Catalog of Fishes returns three hundred and forty species records for freshwater fishes of Japan, excluding synonyms unless valid as a subspecies, and four hundred and thirty-two brackish water fishes, one hundred and ninety-two records representing those found in both systems, one hundred and fifty-six of which are also found in marine environments.

Other than the lampreys with which the list begins, which are jawless fish, all orders are within the clade Actinopterygii, ray-finned fishes.

Order: Petromyzontiformes 

Family: Petromyzontidae
Genus: Entosphenus
Pacific lamprey, Entosphenus tridentatus
Genus: Lethenteron
Arctic lamprey, Lethenteron camtschaticum (MoE: VU (as Lethenteron japonicum))
, Lethenteron kessleri(MoE: NT)
Far Eastern brook lamprey, Lethenteron reissneri

Order: Acipenseriformes 

Family: Acipenseridae
Genus: Acipenser
Green sturgeon, Acipenser medirostris (MoE: EX)
Sakhalin sturgeon, Acipenser mikadoi 
Chinese sturgeon, Acipenser sinensis

Order: Anguilliformes 

Family: Anguillidae
Genus: Anguilla
Shortfin eel, Anguilla bicolor 
Indian shortfin eel, A. b. pacifica(MoE: DD)
Japanese eel, Anguilla japonica (MoE: EN)
Marbled eel, Anguilla marmorata 
Family: Muraenesocidae
Genus: Muraenesox
Daggertooth pike conger, Muraenesox cinereus 
Family: Muraenidae
Genus: Echidna
Pink-lipped moray eel, Echidna rhodochilus(MoE: CR)
Genus: Uropterygius
Brown moray eel, Uropterygius concolor (MoE: CR)

Order: Atheriniformes 
Family: Atherinidae
Genus: Atherinomorus
, Atherinomorus duodecimalis (MoE: DD)
Genus: Hypoatherina
, Hypoatherina temminckii (MoE: DD)
Family: Atherinopsidae
Genus: Odontesthes
Argentinian silverside, Odontesthes bonariensis(introduced)

Order: Aulopiformes 
Family: Synodontidae
Genus: Saurida
Clouded lizardfish, Saurida nebulosa

Order: Beloniformes 

Family: Adrianichthyidae
Genus: Oryzias
Japanese rice fish, Oryzias latipes (endemic) (MoE: VU)
, Oryzias sakaizumii (endemic) (MoE: VU)
Family: Hemiramphidae
Genus: Hyporhamphus
Asian pencil halfbeak, Hyporhamphus intermedius(MoE: NT)
Family: Zenarchopteridae
Genus: Zenarchopterus
Duncker's river garfish, Zenarchopterus dunckeri (MoE: NT)

Order: Callionymiformes 
Family: Callionymidae
Genus: Pseudocalliurichthys
, Pseudocalliurichthys ikedai(MoE: DD)

Order: Clupeiformes 

Family: Clupeidae
Genus: Clupea
Pacific herring, Clupea pallasii 
Family: Engraulidae
Genus: Coilia
Japanese grenadier anchovy, Coilia nasus (MoE: EN)
Genus: Nematalosa
, Nematalosa come 
, Nematalosa japonica (MoE: EN)
Bloch's gizzard shad, Nematalosa nasus 
Genus: Thryssa
, Thryssa baelama

Order: Cypriniformes 

Family: Cobitidae
Genus: Cobitis
, Cobitis biwae
Ajime loach, Cobitis delicata (endemic) (MoE: VU (as Niwaella delicata))
, Cobitis kaibarai (endemic) (MoE: EN)
, Cobitis magnostriata (endemic) (MoE: EN)
Yamato spined loach, Cobitis matsubarae (endemic) (MoE: VU)
Cobitis melanoleuca 
Small stripe spined loach, Cobitis minamorii (endemic)
Sanyōkogatasuji-shimadojō, C. m. minamorii(MoE: CR)
Biwakogatasuji-shimadojō, C. m. oumiensis(MoE: EN)
Saninkogatasuji-shimadojō, C. m. saninensis(MoE: EN)
Tokaikogatasuji-shimadojō, C. m. tokaiensis(MoE: EN)
Yodokogatasuji-shimadojō, C. m. yodoensis(MoE: CR)
Oyodo stripe spined loach, Cobitis sakahoko (endemic) (MoE: EN)
, Cobitis shikokuensis (endemic) (MoE: EN)
Namisuji-shimadojō, Cobitis striata
Ongasuji-shimadojō, C. s. fuchigamii(MoE: EN)
Hakatasuji-shimadojō, C. s. hakataensis(MoE: CR)
Chūgatasuji-shimadojō, C. s. striata(MoE: VU)
, Cobitis takatsuensis (endemic) (MoE: EN)
Tango stripe spined loach, Cobitis takenoi (endemic) (MoE: CR)
Genus: Misgurnus
Pond loach, Misgurnus anguillicaudatus (MoE: NT)
Genus: Parabotia
Kissing loach, Parabotia curtus (endemic) (MoE: CR)
Family: Cyprinidae
Genus: Abbottina
Chinese false gudgeon, Abbottina rivularis(endemic) (MoE: EN)
Genus: Acheilognathus
Striped bitterling, Acheilognathus cyanostigma (endemic) (MoE: CR)
Deepbodied bitterling, Acheilognathus longipinnis (endemic) (MoE: CR)
Giant Chinese bitterling, Acheilognathus macropterus (introduced)
Genuine bitterling, Acheilognathus melanogaster (endemic) (MoE: EN)
Flat bitterling, Acheilognathus rhombeus 
Tabira bitterling, Acheilognathus tabira (endemic)
Red tabira bitterling, A. t. erythropterus(MoE: EN)
Southern red tabira bitterling, A. t. jordani(MoE: CR)
Blotched tabira bitterling, A. t. nakamurae(MoE: CR)
White tabira bitterling, A. t. tabira(MoE: EN)
Northern red tabira bitterling, A. t. tohokuensis(MoE: EN)
Metallic bitterling, Acheilognathus typus (endemic) (MoE: CR)
Genus: Aphyocypris
Chinese bleak, Aphyocypris chinensis (MoE: CR)
Genus: Biwia
Yodo gudgeon, Biwia yodoensis (endemic) (MoE: EN)
Biwa gudgeon, Biwia zezera  (endemic) (MoE: VU)
Genus: Carassius
Goldfish, Carassius auratus 
Round crucian carp, C. a. grandoculis(endemic) (MoE: EN (as Carassius buergeri grandoculis))
Japanese white crucian carp, Carassius cuvieri (MoE: EN)
Japanese silver crucian carp, Carassius langsdorfii
Genus: Ctenopharyngodon
Grass carp, Ctenopharyngodon idella(introduced)
Genus: Cyprinus
Common carp, Cyprinus carpio 
Amur carp, Cyprinus rubrofuscus  (introduced)
Genus: Danio
Pearl danio, Danio albolineatus (introduced on Okinawa Island)
Zebrafish, Danio rerio (introduced on Okinawa Island)
Genus: Gnathopogon
Biwa moroko gudgeon, Gnathopogon caerulescens (endemic) (MoE: CR)
Gnathopogon elongatus(endemic)
Field gudgeon, G. e. elongatus
Suwa gudgeon, G. e. suwae(MoE: EX)
Genus: Hemibarbus
Barbel steed, Hemibarbus barbus
Zunaganigoi, Hemibarbus longirostris 
Genus: Hemiculter
Sharpbelly, Hemiculter leucisculus 
Genus: Hemigrammocypris
Golden venus fish, Hemigrammocypris neglectus (endemic) (MoE: EN)
Genus: Hypophthalmichthys
Silver carp, Hypophthalmichthys molitrix (introduced)
Bighead carp, Hypophthalmichthys nobilis (introduced)
Genus: Ischikauia
Lakeweed chub, Ischikauia steenackeri (endemic) (MoE: CR)
Genus: Mylopharyngodon
Black carp, Mylopharyngodon piceus (introduced)
Genus: Nipponocypris
Numamutsu, Nipponocypris sieboldii
Dark chub, Nipponocypris temminckii
Genus: Opsariichthys
Chinese hook snout carp, Opsariichthys bidens 
Amur three-lips, Opsariichthys uncirostris
Hasu, O. u. uncirostris(MoE: VU)
Genus: Paramisgurnus
Large-scale loach, Paramisgurnus dabryanus(introduced)
Genus: Pseudogobio
Pike gudgeon, Pseudogobio esocinus
Genus: Pseudorasbora
Topmouth gudgeon, Pseudorasbora parva 
Ushimotsugo minnow, Pseudorasbora pugnax (endemic) (MoE: CR)
Shinai topmouth gudgeon, Pseudorasbora pumila (endemic) (MoE: CR)
Genus: Pungtungia
Black stripe gudgeon, Pungtungia herzi
Genus: Rhodeus
Kyushu bitterling, Rhodeus atremius (endemic)
Kyushu rose bitterling, R. a. atremius(MoE: EN)
Suigen rose bitterling, R. a. suigensis(MoE: CR)
Rosy bitterling, Rhodeus ocellatus 
Japanese rose bitterling, R. o. kurumeus(MoE: CR)
Rose bitterling, R. o. ocellatus(introduced) 
Genus: Rhynchocypris
Amur minnow, Rhynchocypris lagowskii
Japanese fat minnow, R. l. steindachneri
Yamanaka minnow, R. l. yamamotis(MoE: DD (as Phoxinus lagowskii yamamotis))
Chinese minnow, Rhynchocypris oxycephalus
Takahaya, R. o. jouyi
Lake minnow, Rhynchocypris percnurus 
, R. p. sachalinensis(MoE: NT (as Phoxinus percnurus sachalinensis))
Sakhalin minnow, Rhynchocypris sachalinensis 
Genus: Sarcocheilichthys
Oily gudgeon, Sarcocheilichthys biwaensis (endemic) (MoE: CR)
Higai minnow, Sarcocheilichthys variegatus
Biwa minnow, S. v. microoculus
Kawa-higai, S. v. variegatus(MoE: NT)
Genus: Squalidus
Khanka gudgeon, Squalidus chankaensis
Sugo-moroko, S. c. biwae(MoE: VU)
Kōrai-moroko, S. c. tsuchigae
Squalidus gracilis
, S. g. gracilis
Squalidus japonicus
Japanese gudgeon, S. j. japonicus(MoE: VU)
Genus: Tanakia
Slender bitterling, Tanakia lanceolata (MoE: NT)
Oily bitterling, Tanakia limbata (endemic) (MoE: NT)
Tokyo bitterling, Tanakia tanago (endemic) (MoE: CR)
Genus: Tribolodon
Pacific redfin, Tribolodon brandtii
Jūsan-ugui, T. b. brandtii
Maruta [ja], T. b. maruta
Big-scaled redfin, Tribolodon hakonensis
Long lowerjaw dace, Tribolodon nakamurai (endemic) (MoE: EN)
, Tribolodon sachalinensis
Genus: Zacco
Freshwater minnow, Zacco platypus
Family: Nemacheilidae
Genus: Barbatula
Barbatula oreas
Siberian stone loach, Barbatula toni
Genus: Lefua
, Lefua echigonia (endemic) (MoE: EN)
, Lefua nikkonis (endemic) (MoE: EN (as Lefua costata nikkonis))
Tōkainagare-hotokedojō, Lefua tokaiensis(endemic) (MoE: EN)
Nagare-hotokedojō, Lefua torrentis(endemic) (MoE: EN)

Order: Cyprinodontiformes 
Family: Poeciliidae
Genus: Gambusia
Mosquitofish, Gambusia affinis (introduced)
Genus: Poecilia
Guppy, Poecilia reticulata (introduced)
Molly, Poecilia sphenops (introduced in Hokkaidō)
Genus: Xiphophorus
Green swordtail, Xiphophorus hellerii (introduced)
Southern platyfish, Xiphophorus maculatus (introduced on Okinawa Island but population possibly extinct)

Order: Elopiformes 

Family: Elopidae
Genus: Elops
Ten-pounder, Elops machnata 
Family: Megalopidae
Genus: Megalops
Indo-Pacific tarpon, Megalops cyprinoides

Order: Gasterosteiformes 

Family: Gasterosteidae
Genus: Gasterosteus
Three-spined stickleback, Gasterosteus aculeatus 
Smallhead stickleback, Gasterosteus microcephalus
Japan Sea stickleback, Gasterosteus nipponicus
Genus: Pungitius
Short ninespine stickleback, Pungitius kaibarae(MoE: EX)
Ninespine stickleback, Pungitius pungitius 
Amur stickleback, Pungitius sinensis 
Sakhalin stickleback, Pungitius tymensis (MoE: VU)

Order: Gonorynchiformes 

Family: Chanidae
Genus: Chanos
Milkfish, Chanos chanos

Order: Mugiliformes 

Family: Mugilidae
Genus: Cestraeus
Lobed river mullet, Cestraeus plicatilis (MoE: CR)
Genus: Chelon
Otomebora mullet, Chelon melinopterus 
Greenback mullet, Chelon subviridis (MoE: DD)
Genus: Ellochelon
Squaretail mullet, Ellochelon vaigiensis (MoE: DD)
Genus: Crenimugil
Fringelip mullet, Crenimugil crenilabis 
, Crenimugil heterocheilos (MoE: EN)
Longfin mullet, Crenimugil pedaraki(MoE: DD (as Moolgarda pedaraki))
Bluespot mullet, Crenimugil seheli 
Genus: Osteomugil
Monnashibora, Osteomugil engeli (MoE: DD (as Moolgarda engeli))
Genus: Planiliza
Largescale mullet, Planiliza macrolepis 
Genus: Valamugil
Bluetail mullet, Valamugil buchanani

Order: Osmeriformes 

Family: Osmeridae
Genus: Hypomesus
Japanese smelt, Hypomesus nipponensis 
Pond smelt, Hypomesus olidus (MoE: NT)
Genus: Osmerus
, Osmerus dentex 
Family: Plecoglossidae
Genus: Plecoglossus
Sweetfish, Plecoglossus altivelis 
Ayu, P. a. altivelis
, P. a. ryukyuensis(endemic) (MoE: CR)
Genus: Spirinchus
Shishamo smelt, Spirinchus lanceolatus
Family: Salangidae
Genus: Neosalanx
Ariake dwarf icefish, Neosalanx reganius (endemic) (MoE: CR)
Genus: Salanx
, Salanx ariakensis(MoE: CR)

Order: Perciformes 

Family: Ambassidae
Genus: Ambassis
, Ambassis dussumieri 
, Ambassis interrupta (MoE: DD)
, Ambassis macracanthus (MoE: DD)
Flag-tailed glassfish, Ambassis miops 
, Ambassis urotaenia 
Vachell's glassfish, Ambassis vachellii 
Genus: Pseudambassis
Indian glassy fish, Pseudambassis ranga (introduced on Okinawa Island)
Family: Apogonidae
Genus: Apogon
, Apogon amboinensis 
Genus: Ostorhinchus
, Ostorhinchus lateralis (MoE: DD (as Fibramia lateralis))
Genus: Pseudamia
, Pseudamia amblyuroptera(MoE: DD)
Genus: Yarica
Mangrove cardinalfish, Yarica hyalosoma (MoE: CR)
Family: Blenniidae
Genus: Omobranchus
Chevroned blenny, Omobranchus elongatus (MoE: DD)
Gossamer blenny, Omobranchus ferox (MoE: CR)
Genus: Omox
Omox blenny, Omox biporos (MoE: CR)
Family: Carangidae
Genus: Caranx
Bigeye trevally, Caranx sexfasciatus 
Family: Centrarchidae
Genus: Lepomis
Bluegill, Lepomis macrochirus (introduced)
Genus: Micropterus
Smallmouth bass, Micropterus dolomieu (introduced)
Largemouth bass, Micropterus salmoides (introduced)
Family: Channidae
Genus: Channa
Northern snakehead, Channa argus(introduced)
Small snakehead, Channa asiatica (introduced)
Blotched snakehead, Channa maculata (introduced)
Family: Cichlidae
Genus: Amatitlania
Convict cichlid, Amatitlania nigrofasciata (introduced)
Genus: Oreochromis
Mozambique tilapia, Oreochromis mossambicus (introduced)
Nile tilapia, Oreochromis niloticus (introduced)
Genus: Otopharynx
Otopharynx lithobates (introduced on Okinawa Island)
Genus: Tilapia
Redbelly tilapia, Tilapia zillii (introduced)
Family: Eleotridae
Genus: Belobranchus
Throat-spine gudgeon, Belobranchus belobranchus (MoE: DD)
Genus: Bostrychus
, Bostrychus sinensis (MoE: EN)
Genus: Bunaka
Green-backed gudgeon, Bunaka gyrinoides (MoE: NT)
Genus: Butis
Ambon gudgeon, Butis amboinensis (MoE: CR)
Crimson-tipped gudgeon, Butis butis 
Genus: Eleotris
Spine-cheek gudgeon, Eleotris acanthopomus 
Brown spine-cheek gudgeon, Eleotris fusca 
Broadhead sleeper, Eleotris melanosoma 
, Eleotris oxycephala 
Genus: Eugnathogobius
, Eugnathogobius mindora (MoE: NT)
Genus: Hypseleotris
Tropical carp-gudgeon, Hypseleotris cyprinoides (MoE: EN)
Genus: Ophiocara
Spangled gudgeon, Ophiocara porocephala (MoE: VU)
Family: Epinephelidae
Genus: Epinephelus
, Epinephelus bontoides (MoE: DD)
Family: Gerreidae
Genus: Gerres filamentosus
Threadfin silverbelly, Gerres filamentosus 
Family: Gobiidae
Genus: Acanthogobius
Yellowfin goby, Acanthogobius flavimanus 
, Acanthogobius hasta (endemic) (MoE: VU)
Minami-ashishirohaze, Acanthogobius insularis (endemic) (MoE: VU)
Genus: Acentrogobius
, Acentrogobius audax (MoE: NT)
Tropical sand goby, Acentrogobius caninus (MoE: NT)
Robust mangrove goby, Acentrogobius janthinopterus 
, Acentrogobius suluensis(MoE: NT)
Spotted green goby, Acentrogobius viridipunctatus  (MoE: VU)
Genus: Amblygobius
, Amblygobius linki (MoE: NT)
Genus: Apocryptodon
, Apocryptodon punctatus (endemic) (MoE: VU)
Genus: Awaous
Scribbled goby, Awaous grammepomus 
Largesnout goby, Awaous melanocephalus
Ocellated river goby, Awaous ocellaris
Genus: Bathygobius
Brown frillfin, Bathygobius fuscus 
Genus: Boleophthalmus
Great blue-spotted mudskipper, Boleophthalmus pectinirostris(MoE: EN)
Genus: Caragobius
Scaleless worm goby, Caragobius urolepis (MoE: VU)
Genus: Chaenogobius
Agohaze, Chaenogobius annularis 
Genus: Cristatogobius
Hime-tosakahaze, Cristatogobius aurimaculatus(MoE: CR)
Tosakahaze, Cristatogobius lophius(MoE: EN)
Kuro-tosakahaze, Cristatogobius nonatoae(MoE: CR)
Genus: Eutaeniichthys
Brackish water goby, Eutaeniichthys gilli(MoE: NT)
Genus: Eviota
Urauchi-isohaze, Eviota ocellifer (endemic) (MoE: CR)
Genus: Exyrias
Puntang goby, Exyrias puntang 
Genus: Favonigobius
Indo-pacific tropical sand goby, Favonigobius reichei 
Genus: Glossogobius
Golden flathead goby, Glossogobius aureus (MoE: CR)
, Glossogobius bicirrhosus (MoE: CR)
, Glossogobius circumspectus (MoE: NT)
Bareye goby, Glossogobius giuris 
Iwahaze, Glossogobius illimis 
Urohaze goby, Glossogobius olivaceus 
Genus: Gobiodon
Rippled coral goby, Gobiodon rivulatus 
Genus: Gymnogobius
, Gymnogobius breunigii 
Chestnut goby, Gymnogobius castaneus (MoE: NT)
Kiseruhaze, Gymnogobius cylindricus (endemic) (MoE: EN)
, Gymnogobius isaza (endemic) (MoE: CR)
Edo-haze, Gymnogobius macrognathos(MoE: VU)
Hebihaze, Gymnogobius mororanus(MoE: DD)
Koshinohaze, Gymnogobius nakamurae(MoE: CR)
Sumiukigori, Gymnogobius petschiliensis
Kubohaze, Gymnogobius scrobiculatus (endemic) (MoE: EN)
Shinjiko-haze, Gymnogobius taranetzi (MoE: VU)
Chikuzen-haze, Gymnogobius uchidai (endemic) (MoE: VU)
Shima-ukigori, Gymnogobius opperiens 
, Gymnogobius urotaenia 
Genus: Gobitrichinotus
Sand fish, Gobitrichinotus radiocularis (MoE: NT)
Genus: Istigobius
Ornate goby, Istigobius ornatus 
Genus: Lentipes
Yoroi-bōzuhaze, Lentipes armatus(MoE: CR)
Genus: Leucopsarion
Ice goby, Leucopsarion petersii(MoE: VU)
Genus: Luciogobius
Cave goby, Luciogobius albus (endemic) (MoE: CR)
Nemuri-mimizuhaze, Luciogobius dormitoris (endemic) (MoE: DD)
Nagare-mimizuhaze, Luciogobius fluvialis (endemic) (MoE: NT)
Yusui-mimizuhaze, Luciogobius fonticola (endemic) (MoE: NT)
Flathead goby, Luciogobius guttatus
Well goby, Luciogobius pallidus (endemic) (MoE: NT)
Minamihime-mimizuhaze, Luciogobius ryukyuensis (endemic) (MoE: VU)
Genus: Mangarinus
Uchiwahaze, Mangarinus waterousi 
Genus: Mugilogobius
, Mugilogobius cavifrons (MoE: EN)
Yellowstripe goby, Mugilogobius chulae 
Dusky mangrove goby, Mugilogobius fuscus (MoE: DD)
, Mugilogobius mertoni (MoE: VU)
Genus: Odontamblyopus
Warasubo, Odontamblyopus lacepedii(MoE: VU)
Genus: Oligolepis
Sharptail goby, Oligolepis acutipennis 
, Oligolepis stomias 
Genus: Oxyurichthys
Shimasaruhaze, Oxyurichthys takagi (MoE: CR)
Genus: Pandaka
Lidwill's dwarf goby, Pandaka lidwilli(MoE: VU)
Genus: Parkraemeria
Ginpohaze, Parkraemeria saltator (endemic) (MoE: VU)
Genus: Periophthalmus
Barred mudskipper, Periophthalmus argentilineatus 
Shuttles mudskipper, Periophthalmus modestus(MoE: NT)
Genus: Psammogobius
Sleepy goby, Psammogobius biocellatus 
Genus: Pseudapocryptes
Hokohaze, Pseudapocryptes elongatus 
Genus: Pseudogobius
, Pseudogobius masago(MoE: VU)
Black-spotted goby, Pseudogobius melanosticta (MoE: DD (as Pseudogobius gastrospilos))
Northern fatnose goby, Pseudogobius poicilosoma 
Genus: Redigobius
Girdled goby, Redigobius balteatus (endemic) (MoE: DD)
Speckled goby, Redigobius bikolanus 
Genus: Rhinogobius
Biwa yellow-gill goby, Rhinogobius biwaensis (endemic) (MoE: DD)
Amur goby [es], Rhinogobius brunneus 
Lizard goby, Rhinogobius flumineus
Ō-yoshinobori, Rhinogobius fluviatilis
Barcheek goby, Rhinogobius giurinus 
Orange Amur goby, Rhinogobius kurodai
Hori-yoshinobori, Rhinogobius mizunoi
Shima-yoshinobori, Rhinogobius nagoyae
, Rhinogobius ogasawaraensis (endemic) (MoE: EN)
Tōkai-yoshinobori, Rhinogobius telma(MoE: NT)
Shimahire-yoshinobori, Rhinogobius tyoni(MoE: NT)
Genus: Scartelaos
, Scartelaos histophorus (MoE: CR)
Genus: Schismatogobius
Shima-esohaze, Schismatogobius ampluvinculus (MoE: EN)
Kaeru-esohaze, Schismatogobius marmoratus 
Esohaze, Schismatogobius roxasi (MoE: EN)
Genus: Sicyopterus
, Sicyopterus japonicus
Red-tailed goby, Sicyopterus lagocephalus (MoE: VU)
Sicyopterus macrostetholepis'''
Genus: SicyopusHinokoromo-bōzuhaze, Sicyopus auxilimentus (MoE: DD)Aka-bōzuhaze, Sicyopus zosterophorus (MoE: CR)
Genus: SilhouetteaShiranui-haze, Silhouettea dotui (endemic) (MoE: NT)
Genus: SmilosicyopusKaeru-haze, Smilosicyopus leprurus (endemic) (MoE: CR)
Genus: StenogobiusDōke-haze, Stenogobius ophthalmoporus (MoE: DD)
Genus: StiphodonHisui-bōzuhaze, Stiphodon alcedo(MoE: CR)Konteri-bōzuhaze, Stiphodon atropurpureus (MoE: CR)Hayase-bōzuhaze, Stiphodon imperiorientis (endemic) (MoE: CR)Torafu-bōzuhaze, Stiphodon multisquamus (MoE: DD)Niraikanai-bōzuhaze, Stiphodon niraikanaiensis(MoE: DD)Nanyō-bōzuhaze, Stiphodon percnopterygionus Kakiirohime-bōzuhaze, Stiphodon surrufus (MoE: DD)
Genus: TaenioidesEel worm goby, Taenioides anguillaris 
Whiskered eel goby, Taenioides cirratus (MoE: EN)
Genus: TridentigerShokihaze goby, Tridentiger barbatus(MoE: NT)
Short-spined Japanese trident goby, Tridentiger brevispinisShimofuri goby, Tridentiger bifasciatus Naganogori, Tridentiger kuroiwae (endemic)
Bare-naped goby, Tridentiger nudicervicus(MoE: NT)
Japanese trident goby, Tridentiger obscurusChameleon goby, Tridentiger trigonocephalus 
Genus: TrypauchenIndo-Pacific burrowing goby, Trypauchen vagina 
Genus: TrypauchenopsisBearded eel goby, Trypauchenopsis intermedia (MoE: VU)
Genus: YongeichthysShadow goby, Yongeichthys nebulosus 
Family: Haemulidae
Genus: PlectorhinchusGiant sweetlips, Plectorhinchus albovittatus(MoE: DD)
Brown sweetlips, Plectorhinchus gibbosus 
Family: Kraemeriidae
Genus: KraemeriaTonga-sunahaze, Kraemeria tongaensis (MoE: DD)
Family: Kuhliidae
Genus: KuhliaDark-margined flagtail, Kuhlia marginata 
Five-bar flagtail, Kuhlia mugil 
, Kuhlia munda (MoE: EN)
Jungle perch, Kuhlia rupestris 
Family: Lateolabracidae
Genus: LateolabraxJapanese sea bass, Lateolabrax japonicusFamily: Latidae
Genus: LatesBarramundi, Lates calcarifer 
Japanese barramundi, Lates japonicus (endemic) (MoE: EN)
Family: Leiognathidae
Genus: AurigequulaStriped ponyfish, Aurigequula fasciata 
Genus: Equulites, Equulites leuciscus 
Genus: EubleekeriaSplendid ponyfish, Eubleekeria splendens 
Genus: GazzaToothed ponyfish, Gazza minuta 
Genus: LeiognathusCommon ponyfish, Leiognathus equulus 
Family: Lutjanidae
Genus: LutjanusBlackspot snapper, Lutjanus ehrenbergii 
Blacktail snapper, Lutjanus fulvus 
Papuan black snapper, Lutjanus goldiei(MoE: CR)
Family: Microdesmidae
Genus: ParioglossusKujakuhaze, Parioglossus caeruleolineatus (endemic) (MoE: DD)
Beautiful hover goby, Parioglossus formosus 
, Parioglossus lineatus (MoE: DD)
, Parioglossus interruptus(MoE: CR)
Estuarine dartfish, Parioglossus palustris (MoE: VU)
, Parioglossus rainfordi (MoE: EN)
, Parioglossus raoi 
, Parioglossus taeniatus (MoE: CR)
Family: Monodactylidae
Genus: MonodactylusSilver moony, Monodactylus argenteus 
Family: Odontobutidae
Genus: MicropercopsYokoshima-donko, Micropercops swinhonis 
Genus: OdontobutisIshi-donko, Odontobutis hikimius (endemic) (MoE: VU)
Dark sleeper, Odontobutis obscuraFamily: Osphronemidae
Genus: MacropodusRound-tailed paradise fish, Macropodus ocellatus(introduced)
Paradise fish, Macropodus opercularis (introduced?) (MoE: CR)
Family: Pomacentridae
Genus: Pomacentrus, Pomacentrus taeniometopon 
Family: Rhyacichthyidae
Genus: RhyacichthysLoach goby, Rhyacichthys aspro (MoE: CR)
Family: Scatophagidae
Genus: ScatophagusSpotted scat, Scatophagus argus 
Family: Scombridae
Genus: ScomberomorusChinese mackerel, Scomberomorus sinensis 
Family: Sillaginidae
Genus: SillaginopsLarge-scale whiting, Sillaginops macrolepis(MoE: EN)
Genus: SillagoSmall-scale whiting, Sillago parvisquamis (MoE: CR)
Family: Sinipercidae
Genus: CoreopercaJapanese perch, Coreoperca kawamebari(MoE: EN)
Family: Sparidae
Genus: AcanthopagrusYellowfin seabream, Acanthopagrus latus 
Pacific seabream, Acanthopagrus pacificus (MoE: VU)
, Acanthopagrus sivicolus 
Family: Terapontidae
Genus: Mesopristes, Mesopristes argenteus (MoE: CR)
, Mesopristes cancellatus (MoE: CR)Shimizu-shimaisaki, Mesopristes iravi (MoE: CR)
Genus: TeraponTiger perch, Terapon jarbua 
Family: Toxotidae
Genus: ToxotesBanded archerfish, Toxotes jaculatrix (MoE: CR)
Family: Tripterygiidae
Genus: EnneapterygiusUrauchi-hebiginpo, Enneapterygius cheni (MoE: CR)

 Order: Pleuronectiformes 

Family: Pleuronectidae
Genus: PlatichthysStarry flounder, Platichthys stellatus 
Family: Soleidae
Genus: BrachirusOriental sole, Brachirus orientalis  

 Order: Salmoniformes 

Family: Salmonidae
Genus: HuchoSakhalin taimen, Hucho perryi (MoE: EN)
Genus: OncorhynchusPink salmon, Oncorhynchus gorbuschaIwame trout, Oncorhynchus iwame (endemic)Kunimasu, Oncorhynchus kawamurae (endemic) (MoE: EW)
Chum salmon, Oncorhynchus ketaMasu salmon, Oncorhynchus masouRed-spotted masu salmon, O. m. ishikawae (MoE: NT)
Cherry salmon, O. m. masou (MoE: NT)
Rainbow trout, Oncorhynchus mykiss(introduced)
Sockeye salmon, Oncorhynchus nerka  (MoE: CR)
Biwa trout, Oncorhynchus rhodurusGenus: SalmoBrown trout, Salmo trutta (introduced)
Genus: SalvelinusBrook trout, Salvelinus fontinalis(introduced)
Kirikuchi char, Salvelinus japonicus (endemic)
White-spotted charr, Salvelinus leucomaenisHead-spotted charr, S. l. imbrius(MoE: VU)
Japanese charr, S. l. japonicusAmemasu, S. l. leucomaenisNikkō-iwana, S. l. pluvius(MoE: DD)
Dolly Varden trout, Salvelinus malmaOshorokoma, S. m. krascheninnikovi(MoE: VU)
Northern Dolly Varden, S. m. malmaMiyabe charr, S. m. miyabei(MoE: VU)
Lake trout, Salvelinus namaycush(introduced)

 Order: Scorpaeniformes 

Family: Cottidae
Genus: CottusSakhalin sculpin, Cottus amblystomopsis  
Cherskii's sculpin, Cottus czerskii  
Tyuman-river sculpin, Cottus hangiongensisFourspine sculpin, Cottus kazika (endemic) (MoE: VU)
Wrinklehead sculpin, Cottus nozawae  
Japanese fluvial sculpin, Cottus pollux (endemic) (MoE: NT)
Kajika small-egg-type, Cottus reinii (endemic) (MoE: EN)
Genus: TrachidermusRoughskin sculpin, Trachidermus fasciatus(MoE: EN)
Family: Tetrarogidae
Genus: Tetraroge, Tetraroge barbata (MoE: CR)
Freshwater waspfish, Tetraroge nigra (MoE: CR)
Family: Triglidae
Genus: ChelidonichthysBluefin gurnard, Chelidonichthys kumu 

 Order: Siluriformes 

Family: Amblycipitidae
Genus: LiobagrusReddish bullhead, Liobagrus reinii (endemic) (MoE: VU)
Family: Bagridae
Genus: Leiocassis, Leiocassis longirostris 
Genus: TachysurusAriake cuttailed bullhead, Tachysurus aurantiacus (endemic) (MoE: VU)
Korean bullhead, Tachysurus fulvidraco (introduced)
Stumpy bullhead, Tachysurus ichikawai (endemic) (MoE: EN)
Forktail bullhead, Tachysurus nudicepsCuttailed bullhead, Tachysurus tokiensis (endemic) (MoE: VU)
Family: Clariidae
Genus: ClariasWalking catfish, Clarias batrachus (introduced)
, Clarias fuscus (introduced)
Family: Ictaluridae
Genus: IctalurusChannel catfish, Ictalurus punctatus (introduced)
Family: Loricariidae
Genus: PterygoplichthysVermiculated sailfin catfish, Pterygoplichthys disjunctivus(introduced on Okinawa Island)
Family: Siluridae
Genus: SilurusAmur catfish, Silurus asotus 
Lake Biwa catfish, Silurus biwaensis, Silurus lithophilus (endemic) (MoE: NT)

 Order: Synbranchiformes 

Family: Synbranchidae
Genus: MonopterusAsian swamp eel, Monopterus albus 
Oriental swamp eel, Monopterus javanensis 

 Order: Syngnathiformes 

Family: Syngnathidae
Genus: HippichthysBluespeckled pipefish, Hippichthys cyanospilos 
Reticulated freshwater pipefish, Hippichthys heptagonus (MoE: EN)
Beady pipefish, Hippichthys penicillus 
Bellybarred pipefish, Hippichthys spicifer 
Genus: MicrophisFlat-nosed pipefish, Microphis argulus (MoE: CR)
Short-tailed pipefish, Microphis brachyurus 
, Microphis jagorii (MoE: CR)
, Microphis leiaspis  
Ragged-tail pipefish, Microphis retzii (MoE: CR)
Genus: SyngnathusPacific seaweed pipefish, Syngnathus schlegeli 

 Order: Tetraodontiformes 

Family: Tetraodontidae
Genus: ArothronWhite-spotted puffer, Arothron hispidus 
Immaculate puffer, Arothron immaculatus 
Genus: ChelonodonMilkspotted puffer, Chelonodon patoca 
Genus: LagocephalusSilver-cheeked toadfish, Lagocephalus sceleratus 
Genus: Takifugu, Takifugu alboplumbeus 
Ocellated puffer, Takifugu ocellatus 
Obscure puffer, Takifugu obscurus 
Finepatterned puffer, Takifugu poecilonotus''

Japanese names

See also
 List of animals in Japan 
 Wildlife Protection Areas in Japan

References

External links
 Invasive Species of Japan: Fishes
 Eschmeyer's Catalog of Fishes
  List of Japan's All Fish Species

Fish